This is a list of English women Test cricketers. A Test match is an international cricket match between two of the leading cricketing nations. The list is arranged in the order in which each player won her Test cap. Where more than one player won her first Test cap in the same Test match, those players are listed alphabetically by the surname the player was using at the time of the match.

Key

Players
Statistics are correct as of 30 June 2022 after England Women's Test match against South Africa.

References

English Test

Women test cricketers
Cricketers
Cricket